The Rolex Learning Center ("EPFL Learning Center") is the campus hub and library for the École polytechnique fédérale de Lausanne (EPFL), in Lausanne, Switzerland. Designed by the winners of 2010 Pritzker Prize, Japanese-duo SANAA, it opened on 22 February 2010.

History 

Kazuyo Sejima and Ryue Nishizawa, partners of the Tokyo-based design firm SANAA, were selected as the lead architects in EPFL's international competition in December 2004. The team was selected among famous architects, including Pritzker Prize Laureates such as Zaha Hadid, Rem Koolhaas, Diller Scofidio + Renfro, Jean Nouvel, Herzog & de Meuron, Ábalos & Herreros and Xaveer De Geyter.

The construction took place between 2007 and 2009. It cost 110 million Swiss francs and was funded by the Swiss government as well as by private sponsors, Rolex, Logitech, Bouygues Construction, Crédit Suisse, Nestlé, Novartis and SICPA.

The building opened on 22 February 2010 and was inaugurated on 27 May 2010.

Library 

The main library, containing 500,000 printed works, is one of the largest scientific collections in Europe; four large study areas can accommodate 860 students with office space for over 100 EPFL and other employees; a multimedia library will give access to 10,000 online journals and 17,000 e-books, with advanced lending machines and systems for bibliographic search; a study center for use by postgraduate researchers will provide access to the universityʼs major archive and research collection, and there are teaching areas including ten "bubbles" for seminars, group work and other meetings and a Language and Multimedia Center and associated administration offices.

Main functions

 Multimedia library – 500,000 volumes
 Student workspaces – 860 seats
 Multipurpose hall "Forum Rolex" – 600 seats
 Café and bar – 53 seats + exterior
 Food court – 128 seats + exterior
 Restaurant – 80 seats
 Career Center
 Library staff office
 EPFL Precious Book Collection
 Student Association Office (AGEPoly)
 Alumni department (EPFL Alumni)
 Research Laboratory for Computer-Human Interaction in Learning and Instruction
 Center for Digital Education - CEDE
 Presses polytechniques et universitaires romandes (EPFL Press)
 Crédit suisse bank
 Bookshop "La Fontaine"
 Parking (500 places)

Events 

On 2 April 2015, the press conference of Federica Mogherini (High Representative of the European Union for Foreign Affairs) and Mohammad Javad Zarif (Minister of Foreign Affairs of Iran) following the negotiations of the ministers of foreign affairs of the United States, the United Kingdom, Russia, Germany, France, China, the European Union and Iran for a Comprehensive agreement on the Iranian nuclear programme (in the previous days at the Beau-Rivage Palace) was held in the Learning Center.

In popular culture 
Part of the 2014 film Love Is the Perfect Crime was filmed at the EPFL Learning Center.

See also 
 Cantonal and University Library of Lausanne
 Lausanne campus

References

External links 

 
 EPFL Library 
 Learning Center construction blog
 Photo documentation of the construction
 

Universities in Switzerland
Buildings and structures in Lausanne
Architecture in Switzerland
SANAA buildings
Education in Lausanne
Rolex sponsorships